Guildford Black Friary was a medieval monastic house in Surrey, England.

1272-1538
A house of Dominican friars was founded in Guildford, by right, by Queen Eleanor of Provence (died 1291), at some time after the death of her husband Henry III. It also received great timbers and money until the end of that century to enable a large construction, in wood and stone. This included £100 (if loose estimates for the year 1323 are taken as accurate) and timber from John de Westpurle. The friary was on the east bank of the River Wey, north of the High Street at the end of the present Friary Street.

On 6 March 1275 Edward I granted the Dominican friars a road leading from Guildford to the royal park and forest opposite, across the river, to be enclosed for enlarging their area.

Henry VIII dis-established the institution and instead had a secular hunting lodge built within the precincts of this enlarged area. However, he later retained the priory in his own lands, and converted the friary house into a dwelling as an occasional royal resort.

In July 1530 Henry VIII gave a 'reward' of £5 to the friars of Guildford, and also what was then a generous annual clerical salary in a lump sum (evidently for some special service) of £12 10s., through the Duke of Norfolk, to a friar called Anserois at Guildford, . The gift of £5 to the friars was renewed in July 1531. It has been conjectured that these gifts were in return for the labours of some of the community, who were known to be skilled in horticulture, in laying out the royal gardens and grounds at Guildford. However his asset-stripping breakaway of the Church of England from the established church saw the friary dissolved on 10 October 1538 but the house remained standing until 1606 when it was partly pulled down on the instruction of Sir George More, who carried away the materials by leave of George Austen, possibly for substantial use in building the wing which More added to Loseley Park, Artington. In 1630 the site was granted in fee simple to the Earl of Annandale who had been given £100 to spend on the building in 1609, and on this site he had a new house built by Inigo Jones. This property was eventually changed into barracks in 1794, and pulled down in 1818.

The site was built over and occupied by the Friary Brewery from 1873 to 1969 and finally became The Friary Shopping Centre.

Predecessor

Ordine Cruciferorum
Before the shopping centre was built, the site of the Friary was excavated in 1974 and 1978. During these excavations, traces of an earlier building were found under the Dominican building. The Victoria County History recorded the skepticism of Tanner's description of crossed friars here. This building had pottery dating after 1250. It has been suggested that this was the House of the Friars de Ordine Martyrum at Guildford. Also referred to as the 'Fratres Ordinis S Morise de Ordine Cruciferorum', this was a small and short-lived order, who came to Britain in 1244. In 1260 they were given permission to inhabit a piece of land they had acquired at Guildford.  As they were short-lived in acceptance they were known as the Crutched/Crossed Friars.  The Friars de Ordine Martyrum was dissolved by the Council of Lyons in 1274, along with a number of the smaller orders what in English were informally termed the Friars of the Sack who are recorded here once in records and the Pied Friars. The excavations revealing a structure built after 1250 but which must have ceased to exist before 1275, along with the documentary evidence for the presence of the Friars de Ordine Martyrum supports the suggestion that this was the original Friary. The Friars de Ordine Martyrum, were one of a number of small orders that have been loosely grouped under the umbrella of the Crutched Friars or Crossed Friars, all of whom followed the Augustinian tradition, and who came to England in the 13th century from Italy.

There has also been the suggestion of a late medieval resurrection of this, associated with the Spital, or St. Thomas's Hospital, that once stood in the angle between the Epsom and London roads in Guildford. However, the only authority for the existence of a house of crutched friars at Guildford is in Tanner and in Speed's "History of Great Britaine" in 1611. No other writers mention this group, nor do any contemporary documents mention it where they otherwise might.

References

Monasteries in Surrey
Dominican monasteries in England
1538 disestablishments in England
Christian monasteries established in the 13th century
13th-century establishments in England
Buildings and structures in Guildford